L. sylvestris may refer to:
 Lathyrus sylvestris, the narrow-leaved everlasting-pea, a plant species
 Lingelsheimia sylvestris, a plant species found in Tanzania

See also 
 Sylvestris (disambiguation)